The N1 road is one of the national roads of Senegal. It connects the west and the east of the country by a direct route across the middle from the capital Dakar via Mbour, Fatick, Kaolack, Kaffrine, Koungheul, Tambacounda, Goudiry to Nayé and Kidira on the border with Mali. It connects with the N4 at Kaolack and the N2 at Kadira.

See also
 N2 road
 N3 road
 N4 road
 N5 road
 N6 road
 N7 road
 Transport in Senegal
 

Road transport in Senegal